Yanbian Library is a library located in Yanji City, Yanbian Korean Autonomous Prefecture, Jilin Province, China. With a collection of over 80 thousand books in Korean, it is the largest and the only one Korean literature collection center in China.

History 
Yanbian Library was constructed in February 1949. People's Government of Jilin Province formally named the library as "Yanbian Library" on 6 January 1955. In order to solve the problem of saturation of the building, the library was moved to the western part of Yanji City in 2012.

References 

Libraries in Jilin
Public libraries in China
2012 establishments in China
Libraries established in 1949